Timothy Wells Rossiter (March 28, 1751 – August 27, 1845) was a physician and later an American Revolutionary War surgeon under General George Washington. Timothy Wells Rossiter was born March 28, 1751, in New London, Connecticut, and died at the age of 95 on August 27, 1845, in Hancock County, Sparta, Georgia.

Dr. Timothy Wells Rossiter, the son of a Presbyterian Congregational minister is descended from Bray (Bryan) Rossiter who arrived in Dorchester, Massachusetts Bay Colony, in 1630 aboard the Mary & John from England.  Bray Rossiter settled in Windsor, Connecticut, where he practiced as a physician, became a landed proprietor of the settlement, its first town clerk and registrar, and later moved to Guilford, Connecticut in 1652.  He performed the first post-mortem in the colony.  One of his children was also named Timothy, which became a common family name among several branches of the family.

American Revolution

Timothy W. Rosseter is listed as serving as a Surgeon's Mate of Fellow's Massachusetts Regiment from May to December 1775 and as a Surgeon's Mate in the 19th Continental Infantry from January 1 to December 31, 1776. He is also noted in Georgia's Roster of the Revolution as being a Surgeon's mate and Surgeon as well.  Dr. Rossiter served in the Continental Troops, Second Regiment, Light Dragoons. The Second Regiment Light Dragoons was commissioned by Congress at General Washington's request on December 12, 1776. Washington directed the Regiment's commander, Elisha Sheldon of Litchfield, Conn. to choose "gentlemen of true spirits and of good character." In the next five months, the Regiment was mustered and trained at Wethersfield, Conn. by Major Benjamin Tallmadge.  On the 6th of June 1777, after hearing local pastor Judah Champion exhort them "to be the avenging angels of destiny", they rode to support Washington's New Jersey campaign.

Post-war life
In October 1783 Dr. Rosssiter married Prudence Punderson, whose family were Loyalists during the Revolution.

Rosseter is listed in the tax list for the Ranes District of Hancock County, in 1794 for the Georgia Tax Index, 1789–1799.

A Georgia Tax List of 1812 lists "Tim. W. Rosseter" as living in Hancock County.

Timothy W. Rossiter is listed as a charter member of Mt. Zion Presbyterian Church and was ordained one of the original elders, which was organized in 1813 and a church built in 1814 from funds raised.  (The church became a Methodist congregation in 1903; in 1969 the property was donated to the Hancock County Foundation for Historic Preservation.)

As a former military serviceman, Timothy W. Rosseter is listed as successfully drawing for land in the Georgia Land Lottery of April 12, 1827.  It notes him as having served during the Revolutionary War.  It appears that he received land in the 108th Captains District, No. 249, District 13, Lee County.

The Georgia Pension Roll of 1835 notes that Timothy W. Rosseter had served in the Revolutionary War as a Surgeon's Mate (an officer), in the Connecticut Continental Line.  He was approved to receive an annual allowance of $240, based on his rank, and his pension started on March 27, 1832, when he was 82 years of age.

In the US Census of 1840, "Timothy Rossiter" is listed as among ten Revolutionary War pensioners still alive in Hancock County, aged 90 years.

References 

American surgeons
People of Connecticut in the American Revolution
1751 births
1845 deaths
People from New London, Connecticut
Physicians from Connecticut
People from Sparta, Georgia
Physicians from Georgia (U.S. state)
18th-century American physicians
19th-century American physicians
18th-century surgeons
19th-century surgeons